Daphne Gail Fautin (25 May 1946 – 12 March 2021) was an American professor of invertebrate zoology at the University of Kansas, specializing in sea anemones and symbiosis. She is world-renowned for her extensive work studying and classifying sea anemones and related species. A large sea anemone-like cnidarian species has been named in her honor, originally called Boloceroides daphneae, but recently renamed to Relicanthus daphneae, after it was discovered (using DNA-based identification techniques) to belong to a previously unknown cnidarian order. Fautin has published numerous scientific articles and texts—including co-authoring Encyclopædia Britannica's entry on cnidarians—and her publications have been widely cited by other researchers in the field. Among her current positions, she is the curator of the University of Kansas Natural History Museum and serves as vice president and commissioner of the International Commission on Zoological Nomenclature, overseeing the naming of new species.

Fautin has been called "the world authority on [sea] anemones", by Prof. J. Frederick Grassle of Rutgers University, who led the international Census of Marine Life which was completed in 2010. She has personally identified at least 19 new species and has co-created with her husband, Prof. R. W. Buddemeier of the Kansas Geological Survey, an extensive database of hexacorals and related species as part of the census.

Although she lived and worked in landlocked Lawrence, Kansas, she felt that working from dry land was not a serious impediment, stating that "you only need to be near an airport, not the ocean."

Education
She received her B.S. in biology (magna cum laude) in 1966 from Beloit College, Beloit, Wisconsin, and her Ph.D. in zoology in 1972 from the University of California, Berkeley. Her Ph.D. dissertation was "Natural History of the Sea Anemone Epiactis prolifera Verrill, 1869, with Special Reference to Its Reproductive Biology". She has served as the editor of the scientific journal  Annual Review of Ecology and Systematics (1992-2001).

She died on March 12, 2021.

Notes

External links
 ICZN page
 
 University of Kansas page
 "Cnidarians" (Encyclopædia Britannica)
 Hexacoral site at University of Kansas
 Field Guide to Anemone Fishes and their Host Sea Anemones
 Relicanthus daphneae (Boloceroides daphnae)

2021 deaths
Beloit College alumni
University of California, Berkeley alumni
University of Kansas faculty
American women biologists
Women zoologists
1946 births
American women academics
Annual Reviews (publisher) editors
21st-century American women